Albert Dejonghe (Middelkerke, 14 February 1894 — Middelkerke, 23 February 1981) was a Belgian professional road bicycle racer. He won Paris–Roubaix in 1922, one stage in the 1923 Tour de France and finished 5th and 6th in the 1925 and 1926 Tour de France.

Career
In 1919 following The Great War a race was held touring the battlefields of Belgium, Luxembourg and France. Dejonghe won stage two of the race but did not end up placing highly overall.
In 1922 Dejonghe won Paris–Roubaix a cycling monument. He is one of two cyclists to ever win the prestigious race while sporting a mustache.

Major results
Sources:
1913
 3rd Tour of Belgium
1919
 1st Stage 2 Circuit des Champs de Bataille
 2nd Retinne - Marche - Retinne
 3rd Bordeaux–Paris
 3rd De Drie Zustersteden
1920
 2nd Tour of Flanders
 2nd Retinne - Spa - Retinne
 2nd Overall Tour of Belgium
 3rd Paris–Tours
1921
 7th Liège–Bastogne–Liège
1922
 1st Paris–Roubaix
1923
 1st Stage 4 Tour de France
 3rd Tour of Flanders
1925
 5th Overall Tour de France
1926
 1st  Paris - Angers, Angers
 6th Overall Tour de France

References

External links 

Official Tour de France results for Albert Dejonghe

Belgian male cyclists
1894 births
1981 deaths
Belgian Tour de France stage winners
Cyclists from West Flanders
People from Middelkerke